Roy Wilkins was a highly respected senior official of the National Association for the Advancement of Colored People, and in 1980 the Association created the Roy Wilkins Renown Service Award for members of United States Armed Forces who had advanced civil rights.

References

Awards established in 1980
American awards
Awards honoring African Americans
1980 establishments in the United States
NAACP